Galalith (Erinoid in the United Kingdom) is a synthetic plastic material manufactured by the interaction of casein and formaldehyde. It is odourless, insoluble in water, biodegradable, non-allergenic, antistatic and virtually nonflammable. It was produced under other names such as aladdinite (in the US), Casolith (in the Netherlands) and lactoloid (in Japan).

Discovery
In 1893, French chemist Auguste Trillat discovered the means to insolubilize (i.e., to make a substance incapable of being dissolved in a liquid, especially water) casein by immersion in formaldehyde. In 1897, Wilhelm Krische, a printer from Hanover, was commissioned to develop white, non-flammable, erasable chalkboards. He had difficulty in making the casein adhere to the supporting cardboard, and asked German chemist (Friedrich) Adolph Spitteler (1846–1940) for help. The resultant horn-like plastic was unsuitable for the original purpose, but other applications were soon found.

Production and usage
Galalith could not be moulded once set, so it had to be produced in sheets, but it had the advantage that it was inexpensive to produce. It could be cut, drilled, embossed and dyed without difficulty, and its structure could be manipulated to create a range of effects. One limitation on the uses of Galalith was that when made into items above a certain size it tended to splinter or warp. No other plastic at the time could compete on price, however, and with ivory, horn and bone products becoming far more expensive, it found a natural home in the fashion industry.

This new plastic was presented at Paris Universal Exhibition in 1900. In France, Galalith was distributed by the Compagnie Française de Galalithe located near Paris in Levallois-Perret. As a result, the Jura area became the first to use the material.

Galalith was marketed in boards, pipes and rods. In 1913, thirty million litres (eight million US gallons) of milk were used to produce Galalith in Germany alone. In 1914, Syrolit Ltd gained the license for manufacture in the United Kingdom. Renaming itself Erinoid Ltd., it started manufacture in the former Lightpill wool mill in Dudbridge, Stroud, Gloucestershire. Casein from rennet produces a superior plastic to acid-precipitated casein.

Galalith could produce gemstone imitations that looked strikingly real. In 1926, Gabrielle "Coco" Chanel published a picture of a short, simple black dress in Vogue. It was calf-length, straight, and decorated only by a few diagonal lines. Vogue called it "Chanel's Ford", as like the Model T, the little black dress was simple and accessible for women of all social classes. To accessorize the little black dress, Chanel revamped her designs, thus facilitating the breakthrough and mass popularity of costume jewelry. Galalith was used for striking Art Deco jewelry designs by artists such as Jacob Bengel and Auguste Bonaz, as well as for hair combs and accessories.  By the 1930s, Galalith was also used for knitting needles, pens, umbrella handles, white piano keys (replacing natural ivory), and electrical goods, with world production at that time reaching 10,000 tons.

Modern use 

Although Galalith was historically cheap, the fact it could not be moulded led to its demise by commercial end users. Production slowed as the restrictions of World War II led to a need for milk as a food, and due to new oil-derived wartime plastic developments. Production continued in Brazil until the 1960s. In the UK production continued until 1980 as part of the many plastic products manufactured by BP. 

Nowadays Galalith still continues to be produced in small quantities, mainly for buttons.

See also 
 Bakelite

References

External links
 

Plastics
Dairy products